Steffen Radochla (born 19 October 1978, in Leipzig) is a German former road cyclist, who was professional from 2001 until 2013. He last rode for the  team.

Major results

2000
 1st Rund um Berlin
 1st Stage 1 Sachsen-Tour
2001
 1st Stage 2 Étoile de Bessèges
 3rd Grand Prix de la Ville de Lillers
2002
 1st Memorial Rik Van Steenbergen
 1st Henk Vos Memorial
 1st Stage 4a Hessen Rundfahrt
 1st Stage 5 Sachsen-Tour
 4th Overall Circuit Franco-Belge
2003
 1st Stage 1 Österreich Rundfahrt
 3rd Scheldeprijs
 5th Rund um Köln
2005
 4th Neuseen Classics
 5th GP Herning
 6th Scheldeprijs
 6th Nokere-Koerse
 9th Ronde van Midden-Zeeland
 9th GP Aarhus
2006
 1st Stages 3 & 5 Giro del Capo
 1st Stage 3 Tour du Poitou Charentes
 1st  Points classification Tour de Langkawi
 2nd Veenendaal–Veenendaal
 3rd Memorial Rik Van Steenbergen
 5th Omloop van de Vlaamse Scheldeboorden
 6th Neuseen Classics
 7th Ronde van Drenthe
2007
 1st Dutch Food Valley Classic
 1st Stage 2 Rheinland-Pfalz Rundfahrt
 2nd Neuseen Classics
 4th Ronde van het Groene Hart
 5th Sparkassen Münsterland Giro
 6th Ronde van Midden-Zeeland
2008
 1st Neuseen Classics
 1st Stage 5 Szlakiem Grodow Piastowskich
 3rd Rund um die Nürnberger Altstadt
2009
 8th Neuseen Classics
2010
 1st Stage 4 Volta ao Alentejo
 2nd Road race, National Road Championships
 2nd Neuseen Classics
 3rd Rund um Düren
 4th Ronde van Noord-Holland
 7th Beverbeek Classic
2011
 2nd Neuseen Classics
 4th Overall Course de Solidarność et des Champions Olympiques
1st Stage 4
 6th Ster van Zwolle
 7th Sparkassen Münsterland Giro
2012
 1st Puchar Uzdrowisk Karpackich
 1st  Mountains classification Bayern Rundfahrt
 3rd Memoriał Henryka Łasaka
 5th Neuseen Classics
 9th GP Stad Zottegem
2013
 7th Kampioenschap van Vlaanderen

References

External links

 

1978 births
Living people
German male cyclists
Sportspeople from Leipzig
People from Bezirk Leipzig
Cyclists from Saxony